Cremnosterna is a genus of longhorn beetles of the subfamily Lamiinae, containing the following species:

 Cremnosterna alboplagiata Breuning, 1935
 Cremnosterna alternans Breuning & Itzinger, 1943
 Cremnosterna carissima (Pascoe, 1857)
 Cremnosterna laterialba Breuning, 1936
 Cremnosterna parvicollis (Gahan, 1895)
 Cremnosterna plagiata (White, 1858)
 Cremnosterna quadriplagiata Breuning, 1940

References

Lamiini